Orlando Chaves (born 5 February 1963) is a Brazilian water polo player. He competed in the men's tournament at the 1984 Summer Olympics.

References

External links
 

1963 births
Living people
Brazilian male water polo players
Olympic water polo players of Brazil
Water polo players at the 1984 Summer Olympics
Water polo players from Rio de Janeiro (city)
20th-century Brazilian people